Parner taluka is a taluka in Ahmednagar district in the state of Maharashtra, India.

Geography

Area

The following are area details:

Population

The table below shows the population of the taluka by sex. The data is taken from the 2001 census.

Major villages
For list of all villages in Parner Taluka, visit Villages in Parner taluka

The following are a few of the notable villages of Parner Taluka:
Nighoj (Marathi: निघोज)is a biggest village in Ahmednagar District, Maharashtra, India. It is about 90 kilometres away from Pune and is known for the naturally created potholes (tinajas) on the riverbed of the Kukadi River.[1] Experts from all over the world come here every year to study the phenomenon of their formation.
Mhaskewadi:-mhaskewadi is located near alkuti.famous for Ganesha mandir
Jamgoan जामगाव :- jamgoan is a village situated in parner taluka; This village has a history in second and third panipat war there was a fort named maharaja madhavrao shinde. & Also malagangamata temple, rameshwar temple 
Hivare Korda is a village situated in Parner Taluka. It is 15 km from parner and 5 km from NH 222. It is known for the Malaganga Devi Mandir and its YATRA utsav, which is generally in summer days.
Sawargaon (Guruvache) is one of the village in the Parner Taluka, Near 1 km from National Highway NH-222 (Sawargaon Phata), home to the HANUMAN TEMPLE, Shree Kshetra Hanuman Devastan and Aamati bhakari at a time of Hanuman Yatra Ustav.
 Kasare is the historical village in Parner which is known for "BIROBA VAHAIKE" during yatra utsav.Its very greeny village & "HINDUGARAJANA PRATISTHAN" is of the social group active in kasare which under leading Mr.Jayvant Panmand.
 Devibhoyare is famous for Navratra Ustav of Goddess Shree Devi Ambikamata. It runs a state-level drama competition.
 Parner is the main city in the taluka." AMHI LAKH PARNERKAR" is the social group active in PARNER TALUKA which under leading Mr. Dheerajkumar mahandule.
 Tikhol is a small village in parner towards 14 km north of parner city. It is 3 km from National Highway. It is home to Tikhol DAM
Pimpalgaon Rotha is 12 km from Kanhur. It is known for Shree Kshetra Korthan Khandoba Devastan.
Karegaon is a small village of approximately 550 people, on the west side of Parner Taluka, 2.5 km from National Highway NH-222.
 Goregaon, Parner is a model village of around 5,000 people, developing under the guidance of Babasaheb Tambe.
 Pimpri Jalsen is a village famous for education.
 Takali Dhokeshwar is one of the biggest village in the taluka. On NH-222, Takli Dhokeshwar the location of a Lord Shiva temple near Dhoki, Nagar Road.
 Ralegan Siddhi is considered to be a model of environmental conservation under Anna Hazare.
 Shahajapur village features 50-60 windmills.
 Karjule Hareshwar is 26 km northwest of Parner City. It is famous for the Hareshwar Temple and Mandhol Dam. Maha E Seva Kendra (Mauli Setu Karjule Harya )
 kalewdi village is 31 km northwest of parner city.IS famous for utsav "BUVAMAHARAJ" TEMPLE. and famous human unity and making bhavy samudayik sohala shivajirao group "shivajirao belkar"
 Randhe is famous for the Ambabai [Ambikadevi] Temple.
 Darodi is famous for the Shaikh Bahauddin Chishti Dargaah and Charangeshwar Temple and Khandoba Temple.
 Lonimavala is famous for having a big wall around the village, which was constructed during the times of Shivaji.
 Babulwade is famous for its Lord Shiva temple, which is on the mountain. They celebrate Yatra on Maha Shivaratri.
 Dhawalpuri is famous for the Durgadevi Temple and Fakirbaba Uruse.
 Wadgaon Savtal is 30 km from Parner City. It is famous for the Shree Datta Savtal Baba Temple.
 Kanhur Pathar features a marketplace and the Bhiravnath Temple, Malganga Temple & Shravani Bail Pola Utsav .
Kakanewadi is a small village 3 km from Takali, Dhokeshwar. It is famous for the Shri Ram Mandir and Someshwar Mandir. Shri Ram Pol
Kinhi is a small village 10 km from Parner Takali, Dhokeshwar. It is famous for the Shree Sadguru Omkar Baba Temple.
 Wesdare is a small village 3 km from Kanhur Pathar. It has a Bhairvnath temple and many other temples. 
 Nandur Pathar is a small village of about 2,500 people, on the west side of Parner taluka. It is 4 km from NH-222.
 Katalwedha is a small village 7 km from Ane and Ek Mukhi. Datta is a famous temple there. They celebrate Yatra at Chaitra Purnima.
 Padali Ale is a small village 3 km from Alkuti there are temples of. The mahor Swayambhu Sangameshwara, Dakshin Mukhi Hanuman and Dharmanatha.
 Kamatwadi is a small village with a population of 500. There is a jagrut temple of khandoba. It is 22 km from takli dhokeshwar.
 Walavne (वाळवणे in Marathi/Hindi) is located 39 km west of the district headquarters, Ahmednagar. 194 km from State capital Mumbai. Walavne is surrounded by Shirur Taluka towards South, Nagar taluka towards East, Rahuri taluka towards North, Shrigonda Taluka towards South. The town has no railway station; the nearest is in Ranjangaon Road (station code RNJD). The village is famous for the Godest Shri Bhairavnath. The village contains the Shri Bhairavnath vidyalaya and Z.P. pri. school.
Punewadi is a village nearby parner.Major work is farming.Also well known for BHAIRAVNATH TEMPLE .GANESH KHIND Ganpati Temple is a famous place. Babasaheb Haribhau Chede is Good Social worker and progressive farmer in Punewadi to developing the village by gram vikas abhiyan.. 
Supe is a Town in the Parner Taluka .MIDC in Parner taluka is situated in Supe . Famous wind mills of Shajapur are situated near Supe.It is situated at the Ahmednagar and Pune Highway.
Pimpri Gawali is a village situated in Parner Taluka .It is 23 km away from Parner. This village has been awarded as 'Adarsh gaon '.PG Farmsys is the company which exports the agriculture produce of farmers in many countries.
Alkuti is a village famous for Bhairavnath Temple. One of the oldest schools in Parner district the Shri Sainath High School is located here.
 Hanga is a village situated between Parner and Supe, it is well known for lord Shiva's ancient temple named Hangeshwar temple. The river Hanganadi originates from the mountainous areas and lake situated in Hanga.
 Rui-chhtrapati is The majority of the population in the village is Hindu. There is an old Peshwa time temple of Lord Shiva on the banks of the River Hanga. There are people from various Castes like Mali and Maratha's. The common surnames include Divate,Shinde, Gaikwad, Karape, Baravkar, Mehetre, Sable, Nagare,Bhujbal. There is a very good school Shri Dnyaneshwar Vidyalaya, Rui Chhtrapati which was started by Sarpanch of the village Mr. Sable and is run by a teacher Mr. Bansi Baravkar. It is a most importatant village in parner taluka.
 Shirapur (Marathi : शिरपूर) - Located on bank of Kukadi river, famous for Shree Sidheshwar Temple.
 Panoli पानोली is a small village located around 7 km from Parner. Famous for Kalbhairvnath Temple and yearly yatra.
 Bhalawani भाळवणी is one of the most important villages (Politically & Socially) in Parner taluka. It is situated on the National Highway 222 & on the bank of Kapari river. Bhalawani is around 18 KM on the North side of Parner & 20 KM on West side of Ahmednagar. It is a market place for nearby small villages. Small industrial area is developed around the village. Bhalawani is famous for Shri Nageshwar temple where pilgrims visit specially during Mahashivratri & Shravan month.

Transportation

Bus

Parner is served by the Maharashtra State Road Transport Corporation. These buses provide transportation for people throughout the state of Maharashtra.

Railway

The nearest railway station is Ahmednagar, about 40 kilometers away.

Climate
The climate of Parner is moderate, with variations in temperature ranging between 16 °C and 35 °C.

The following chart details the amount of rainfall per year 1981–2004.

Notable people 
 Senapati Pandurang Mahadev Bapat (1880–1967) was a revolutionary and an Indian freedom fighter. He was born in Parner village.
 Anna Hazare (b.1937) is an Indian social activist recognized for his contribution to the development of Ralegan Siddhi, a village in Ahmednagar district

See also
 List of dams in Parner taluka
 Talukas in Ahmednagar district

References

Cities and towns in Ahmednagar district
Talukas in Maharashtra
Talukas in Ahmednagar district